Antler Peak, el.  is a prominent mountain peak in the Gallatin Range in Yellowstone National Park.  The peak was originally named Bell's Peak in honor of an Assistant Secretary of the Interior by either Philetus Norris, the second park superintendent or W.H.Holmes, a U.S. Geological Survey geologist in 1878.  However, in 1885, Arnold Hague of the U.S. Geological Survey renamed the peak Antler Peak because of the numerous shed elk and deer antlers found on its slopes.

Although Antler Peak is clearly visible from the Grand Loop Road as it passes through Swan Lake Flats and the Indian Creek area, there are no maintained trails to the summit.

See also
Mountains and mountain ranges of Yellowstone National Park

Notes

Mountains of Yellowstone National Park
Mountains of Wyoming
Mountains of Park County, Wyoming